Embla is the first woman in Norse mythology.

Embla may also refer to:
 Embla (given name)
 Embla (horse), a racehorse
 The White Viking, an Icelandic film